Life: An Idiot's Guide is a comedy show hosted by Stephen K. Amos. It started airing on BBC Radio 4 in March 2012.

Format
Stephen K Amos and his pick of the circuit's best stand-ups build an idiot's guide to life.

Episodes

Series 1

References

BBC Radio comedy programmes
2012 radio programme debuts